Martha Parke Firestone Ford (born September 16, 1925) is an American businesswoman and former principal owner and chairperson of the Detroit Lions of the National Football League (NFL).  Ford is also on the board of the Henry Ford Health System.

Early life and education
Born September 16, 1925, in Cleveland, Ohio, Firestone is the daughter of Harvey S. Firestone Jr. and Elizabeth Parke Firestone.  Her paternal grandparents are Firestone Tire and Rubber Co. founder Harvey Samuel Firestone and his wife Idabelle Smith Firestone.

She graduated from Vassar College in 1946.

Professional sports

Detroit Lions
On March 9, 2014, Martha's husband William died at the age of 88.  He had been the sole owner of the Lions since he bought out all other owners in 1963 for US$4.5 million.  On March 10, 2014, it was announced that controlling interest in the Lions would pass to her. She was the majority owner of the team, with each of her four children holding small shares in the team.

Ford was one of ten female NFL team owners at the end of her tenure. The others are Virginia Halas McCaskey (Chicago Bears), Kim Pegula (Buffalo Bills), Carol Davis (Las Vegas Raiders), Dee Haslam (Cleveland Browns), Amy Adams Strunk (Tennessee Titans), Gayle Benson (New Orleans Saints), Janice McNair (Houston Texans), Denise DeBartolo York (San Francisco 49ers) and Jody Allen (Seattle Seahawks).

She stepped down as Lions' owner on June 23, 2020 to be succeeded by her daughter Sheila Ford Hamp.

Personal life

Family
Ford first met her husband, William Clay Ford, a grandson of Henry Ford, at a lunch in New York arranged and attended by both of their mothers, according to the biography The Fords. She then was a Vassar student who had the college nickname “Stoney.” He was a naval cadet at St. Mary's U.S. Navy Pre-Flight School. They married on June 21, 1947 at St. Paul's Episcopal Church in Akron, Ohio.  By that time both families had acquired considerable wealth, and the matchup between the grandchildren of two empire-builders was reported by numerous news outlets.  The Akron Beacon Journal called the Firestone-Ford nuptials “the biggest society wedding in Akron’s history” and “the biggest show Akron has seen in years” in numerous articles chronicling the event.  The couple received gifts from F.B.I. Director J. Edgar Hoover, media publisher John S. Knight, and Mina Miller Edison.

Her husband died in 2014. The couple had four children: Martha Parke Morse (born 1948), Sheila Firestone Hamp (born 1951), William Clay Ford, Jr. (born 1957), and Elizabeth Ford Kontulis (born 1961).  Her son William was  the chairman of the board of directors of Ford Motor Company. He had previously been  the chief executive officer and chief operating officer of Ford and is the vice chairman of the Detroit Lions.

Ford has 14 grandchildren and 11 great-grandchildren.

Ford and her immediate family, and several other members of the extended Ford family, have long lived at Grosse Pointe, Michigan.  They originally lived in Grosse Pointe Woods after relocating to the Detroit area following their marriage.  She has lived in Grosse Pointe Shores since 1960, when she and William had a house built on Lake St. Clair.

See also
 Ford family tree

References

1925 births
Living people
Detroit Lions owners
Firestone family
Henry Ford family
Vassar College alumni
Women in American professional sports management
Women National Football League executives
Women sports owners